Seebeck is a surname. Notable people with the surname include:

 August Seebeck (1805–1849), German scientist
 Nicholas F. Seebeck (1857–1899), German-American stamp printer
 Thomas Johann Seebeck (1770–1831), Baltic German physicist

See also
 Seebeck effect, a form of thermoelectric effect